Mount Carlisle is a stratovolcano in Alaska which forms part of the 5 mile (8 km) wide Carlisle Island, one of the Islands of Four Mountains which, in turn, form part of the central Aleutian Islands.

Despite its modest summit elevation, a small glacier exists high on the western slopes just below the rim of the summit crater.

A few historical eruptions of Carlisle have been recorded, but its proximity to several other neighboring volcanoes means that there has been some confusion in the older records as to which of the volcanoes was erupting. As the area is extremely remote, distant observations of volcanic plumes cannot be verified for certain.



See also

List of mountain peaks of North America
List of mountain peaks of the United States
List of mountain peaks of Alaska
List of Ultras of the United States
List of volcanoes in the United States

References

External links

 Volcanoes of the Alaska Peninsula and Aleutian Islands-Selected Photographs
 Alaska Volcano Observatory

Landforms of Aleutians West Census Area, Alaska
Stratovolcanoes of the United States
Mountains of Alaska
Volcanoes of Alaska
Aleutian Range
Mountains of Unorganized Borough, Alaska
Volcanoes of Unorganized Borough, Alaska
Holocene stratovolcanoes